André Abadie (27 July 1934 – 7 January 2020) was a French rugby union player who played for the French national team from 1965 to 1968. He played at the prop position.

Biography
Abadie played for Sporting Club Rieumois, Sporting Club Graulhetois, and SC Albi during his professional career. His first national team match was on 28 November 1965 against Romania and his last match was on 27 January 1968 against Ireland.

References

1934 births
2020 deaths
French rugby union players
Rugby union players from Toulouse
Rugby union props
SC Albi players